The Best of Chillout: Past and Present is a compilation album released by Nettwerk.

Track listing 
Adapted from AllMusic and the album's official liner notes.

References

External links 
 

2004 compilation albums
Nettwerk Records compilation albums